Staro Selo is a village in the municipality of Jegunovce, North Macedonia. It used to be part of the former municipality of Vratnica.

Demographics
According to the 2002 census, the village had a total of 217 inhabitants. Ethnic groups in the village include:

Macedonians 212
Serbs 5

References

Villages in Jegunovce Municipality